The Sirocco 15, named for the North African wind, is a Canadian trailerable sailboat that was first built in 1970.

Production
The design was built by Sirocco Boatworks in Canada. The company completed 350 examples of the type, but it is now out of production.

Design

The Sirocco 15 is a recreational keelboat, built predominantly of fibreglass. It has a fractional sloop rig, a nearly plumb stem, a vertical transom, a transom-hung rudder controlled by a tiller and an iron swing keel. The boat has a cuddy cabin. It displaces  and carries  of iron ballast.

The boat is normally fitted with a small outboard motor for docking and maneuvering and can be equipped with a spinnaker for downwind sailing.

For sailing downwind the design may be equipped with a symmetrical spinnaker.

See also
List of sailing boat types

Similar sailboats
Catalina 16.5
DS-16
Nordica 16
Tanzer 16
Watkins 17

References

External links

Sirocco 15 photos

Keelboats
1970s sailboat type designs
Sailing yachts
Trailer sailers
Sailboat types built by Sirocco Boatworks